Julien Foucaud (2 July 1847, in Saint-Clément – 26 April 1904, in Rochefort) was a French botanist.

From 1867 to 1885, he was an assistant teacher and teacher in several schools in the department of Charente-Maritime. In February 1885, he was appointed director of the naval botanical garden in Rochefort.

In February 1878, he became a member of the Société Botanique de France. Taxa with the specific epithet of foucaudii are named in his honor. In collaboration with Georges Rouy, he described numerous plant species.

Selected works 
 Flore de l'ouest de la France; ou, Description des plantes qui croissent spontanément dans les départements de: Charente-Inférieure, Deux-Sèvres, Vendée, Loire-Inférieure, Morbihan, Finistère, Côtes-du-Nord, Ille-et-Vilaine (1886), with James Lloyd – Flora of western France, description of plants native to Charente-Inférieure, Deux-Sèvres, Vendée, Loire-Inférieure, Morbihan, Finistère, Côtes-du-Nord and Ille-et-Vilaine.
 Flore de France; ou, Description des plantes qui croissent spontanément en France, en Corse et en Alsace-Lorraine (1893–1913), with Georges Rouy, Edmond Gustave Camus and Jean-Nicolas Boulay – Flora of France, descriptions of plants native to France, Corsica and Alsace-Lorraine.
 Trois semaines d'herborisations en Corse (1898), with Eugène Simon – Three weeks of herborization on Corsica.

References 

1847 births
1904 deaths
People from Charente-Maritime
19th-century French botanists